Claus William Jensen (born 29 April 1977) is a Danish professional football manager,  and former player who is the manager of Danish 1st Division club Nykøbing FC. During his active playing career, he played as an attacking midfielder. Jensen made 47 appearances for the Denmark national team, in which he scored 8 goals. He also represented Denmark at the 2002 World Cup and 2004 European Championship tournaments. He is the cousin of former winger Anders Due, who currently works as his assistant in Nykøbing FC.

Playing career
Jensen was born in Nykøbing Falster, and played for a number of Danish lower-league teams, making his debut for the Danish under-19 national team in November 1995. In May 1996, he was loaned out from Danish second division club Nykøbing Falster Alliancen to Næstved BK in the Danish Superliga. He played four games while at Næstved, but could not prevent the club from being relegated at the end of the season. He moved permanently to Superliga club Lyngby FC in June 1996, signing a contract alongside later Danish international Dennis Rommedahl.

He played two years at Lyngby before moving to play in England in July 1998. He was bought by First Division club Bolton Wanderers in a deal worth 1.8 million DKK. While at Bolton, he debuted for the Danish national team in March 2000.

In July 2000, he moved to London to join promoted Premier League club Charlton Athletic for £4 million, and became a popular player with fans due to his influence during games. The Charlton fans would sing his name to the tune "charge" (often used during baseball matches), using Claus for the build-up and singing his full name "Claus William Jensen" at the climax.  He was called up to the Danish squad for the 2002 World Cup, where he made a single appearance as a substitute. In February 2003, he scored a hat-trick in a 4–1 friendly win against Egypt; one of the goals was scored from a direct free kick. He also represented Denmark at the 2004 European Championship, where he took part in three of Denmark's four matches.

After more than 100 games for Charlton, in July 2004 he moved to the Addicks' London rivals Fulham in a transfer deal worth £1.25 million. He made his Fulham debut at Manchester City on 14 August 2004. He spent three years with Fulham, but was plagued by injury and on 17 May 2007, Fulham manager Lawrie Sanchez decided to release him; Jensen claims his release was inevitable because he did not fit into Sanchez's long ball tactics. After three years with repeating injuries, he chose to end his professional career on 25 August 2007.

Managerial career
On 7 January 2020, Jensen was appointed manager of Nykøbing FC in the Danish second tier, a team in which he formerly held the position of general manager.

Career statistics

Club

International goals
Scores and results list Denmark's goal tally first, score column indicates score after each Jensen goal.

References

External links

1977 births
Living people
Danish men's footballers
Association football midfielders
Denmark international footballers
Denmark under-21 international footballers
2002 FIFA World Cup players
UEFA Euro 2004 players
Danish Superliga players
Premier League players
Lyngby Boldklub players
Bolton Wanderers F.C. players
Charlton Athletic F.C. players
Fulham F.C. players
Næstved Boldklub players
People from Guldborgsund Municipality
Danish expatriate men's footballers
Danish expatriate sportspeople in England
Expatriate footballers in England
Danish 1st Division managers
Sportspeople from Region Zealand